Visma is a genus of sea snails, marine gastropod mollusks in the family Pyramidellidae, the pyrams and their allies.

Species
Species within the genus Visma include:
 Visma sowerbyi van Aartsen & Corgan, 1996

References

External links
 To World Register of Marine Species

Pyramidellidae
Monotypic gastropod genera